Tregoning is a surname. Notable people with that name include:

 Frank Tregoning, American shipyard owner who built motorboat that later served in the US Navy as USS Sans Souci II (SP-301)
 Grant Tregoning (born 1988), New Zealand international speedway rider
 Ian Tregoning, music producer and co-founder of Do It Records
 Max Tregoning, co-founder of Do It Records, brother of the above
 Jack Tregoning (1919–1989), Australian first-class cricketer
 John Tregoning (1840s–1920s), American mechanical engineer and author
 Joseph E. Tregoning (1941–2019), American politician and former member of the Wisconsin State Assembly
 Larry Tregoning, captain of the 1964–65 Michigan Wolverines men's basketball team
 Marcus Tregoning (born 1959), horse racing jockey and trainer
 Nick Tregoning, Liberal Democrat candidate in Wales

See also
 Tregonning (disambiguation)